In rock climbing, mountaineering, and other climbing disciplines, climbers give a grade to a climbing route or boulder problem, intended to describe concisely the difficulty and danger of climbing it. Different types of climbing (such as sport climbing, bouldering or ice climbing) each have their own grading systems, and many nationalities developed their own, distinctive grading systems.

There are a number of factors that contribute to the difficulty of a climb, including the technical difficulty of the moves, the strength, stamina and level of commitment required, and the difficulty of protecting the climber. Different grading systems consider these factors in different ways, so no two grading systems have an exact one-to-one correspondence.

Climbing grades are inherently subjective. They may be the opinion of one or a few climbers, often the first ascensionist or the authors of a guidebook. A grade for an individual route also may be a consensus reached by many climbers who have climbed the route. While grades are usually applied fairly consistently across a climbing area, there are often perceived differences between grading at different climbing areas. Because of these variables, a given climber might find a route to be either easier or more difficult than expected for the grade applied.

History

In 1894, the Austrian mountaineer Fritz Benesch introduced the first known grading system for rock climbing. The Benesch scale had seven levels of difficulty, with level VII the easiest and level I the most difficult. Soon more difficult climbs were made,  which originally were graded level 0 and 00.  In 1923, the German mountaineer Willo Welzenbach compressed the scale and turned the order around, so that level 00 became level IV–V. This "Welzenbach scale" was adopted in 1935 by French mountaineers like Lucien Devies, Pierre Allain and Armand Charlet for routes in the Western Alps and finally in 1947 in Chamonix by the Union Internationale des Associations d'Alpinisme. It prevailed internationally and was renamed in 1968 as the UIAA scale. Originally a 6-grade scale, it has been officially open-ended since 1979.

Free climbing
For free climbing, there are many different grading systems varying according to country. They include:

Yosemite Decimal System

The Yosemite Decimal System (YDS) of grading routes was initially developed as the Sierra Club grading system in the 1930s to rate hikes and climbs in the Sierra Nevada range. The rock climbing at Tahquitz Rock in southern California was pioneered by members of the Climbing Section of the Angeles Chapter of the Sierra Club in the 1950s. It quickly spread to Canada and the rest of the Americas.

Originally a single-part classification system, grade and protection rating categories were added later. The new classifications do not apply to every climb and usage varies widely.

When a route also involves aid climbing, its unique aid designation can be appended to the YDS free climbing rating. For example, the North America Wall on El Capitan would be classed "VI, 5.8, A5[2]", or Medlicott Dome – Bachar/Yerian 5.11c (X,***)

Technical difficulty
The system consists of five classes indicating the technical difficulty of the hardest section. Class 1 is the easiest and consists of walking on even terrain. Class 5 is climbing on vertical or near-vertical rock, and requires skill and a rope to proceed safely. Un-roped falls would result in severe injury or death. Originally, Class 6 was used to grade aid climbing. However, the separate A (aid) rating system became popular instead.

The original intention was that the classes would be subdivided decimally, so that a route graded 4.5 would be a scramble halfway between 4 and 5, and 5.9 would be the hardest rock climb. Increased standards and improved equipment meant that climbs graded 5.9 in the 1960s are now only of moderate difficulty. Rather than regrade all climbs each time standards improve, additional grades were added at the top—originally only 5.10, but it soon became apparent that an open-ended system was needed, and further grades of 5.11, 5.12, etc. were added, and thus the system is no longer decimal.

While the top grade was 5.10, a large range of climbs in this grade was completed, and climbers realized a subdivision of the upper grades was required. Letter grades were added for climbs at 5.10 and above by adding a letter "a" (easiest), "b", "c", or "d" (hardest).

The system originally considered only the technical difficulty of the hardest move on a route. For example, a route of mainly 5.7 moves but with one 5.11b move would be graded 5.11b and a climb that consisted of 5.11b moves all along its route would also be 5.11b. Modern application of climbing grades, especially on climbs at the upper end of the scale (>5.10), also consider how sustained or strenuous a climb is, in addition to the difficulty of the single hardest move.

Length of route
The YDS system involves an optional Roman numeral grade that indicates the length and seriousness of the route. The Grade is more relevant to mountaineering and big wall climbing, and usually not stated when talking about short rock climbs. The grades range from grade I to VI spanning a one-hour climb to a multi-day climb respectively.

I–II: 1 or 2 pitches near the car, but may need to be avoided during avalanche season.

III: Requires most of a day perhaps including the approach, which may require winter travel skills (possible avalanche terrain, placing descent anchors). Only a minority of climbers, the most fit and seasoned, could do this route car to car in a day. Other grade III climbs, such as Cathedral Peak in Tuolumne, are typically done in one day.

IV: A multipitch route at higher altitude or remote location, which may involve multi-hour approaches in serious alpine terrain. A predawn start is usually indicated, and unforeseen delays can lead to unplanned bivouacs high on the route.

V: A multi-day climbing adventure for all but an elite few.

VI: A multi-day climbing adventure for (nearly) all. Peter Croft saves this grade for the full Palisade Traverse, a massive route which includes six  summits and miles of technical climbing. He states, "This is the only route in this book that I haven't completed in a single push, although I've done all the crux sections at various times." Although most grade VIs are alpine climbs, The Nose on El Capitan is an example of a technical grade VI route. It has  of either very hard technical climbing or easier aid climbing and takes most climbers 2–7 days, although a few climbers have freed it in a day, and more have aided it in a day.

VII: Under discussion.

Protection rating
An optional protection rating indicates the spacing and quality of the protection available, for a well-equipped and skilled leader. The letter codes chosen were, at the time, identical to the American system for rating the content of movies. Grades range from solid protection, G (Good), to no protection, X. The G and PG (Pretty Good) ratings are often left out, as being typical of normal, everyday climbing. PG13 ratings are occasionally included. R (Run-out) and X (eXtreme) climbs are usually noted as a caution to the unwary leader. Application of protection ratings varies widely from area to area and from guidebook to guidebook.

British
The British grading system for traditional climbs, also known as the UK grading system, used in Great Britain and Ireland, has (in theory) two parts: the adjectival grade and the technical grade.
Sport climbing in Britain and Ireland uses the French grading system, often prefixed with the letter "F".

Adjectival grade
The adjectival grade attempts to assess the overall difficulty of the climb – taking into account all factors which lend difficulty to a pitch including technical difficulty, sustainedness, protection quality, rock quality, exposure and other less tangible aspects – for a climber leading the route on sight in traditional style. It thus resembles mountaineering grades such as the International French Adjectival System. The adjectival grade appears to have been introduced in the early 20th century by O. G. Jones, who classified climbs as “Easy”; “Moderate”; “Difficult” or “Exceptionally Severe”. Increasing standards have several times led to extra grades being added. The adjectival grades are as follows:
 Easy (rarely used)
 Moderate (M, or "Mod")
 Difficult (D, or "Diff")
 Hard Difficult (HD, or "Hard Diff" – often omitted)
 Very Difficult (VD, or "V Diff")
 Hard Very Difficult (HVD, or "Hard V Diff" – sometimes omitted)
 Mild Severe (MS – often omitted)
 Severe (S)
 Hard Severe (HS)
 Mild Very Severe (MVS – often omitted)
 Very Severe (VS)
 Hard Very Severe (HVS)
 Extremely Severe (E1, E2, E3, ...)

Increasing standards in the 1970s resulted in the adoption of Pete Botterill's proposal that the Extremely Severe grade be subdivided in an open-ended fashion into E1 (easiest), E2, E3 and so on. The E-grade is still an estimation of overall difficulty experienced by a climber leading a route on-sight.

In 2006 the hardest grade claimed was E11 for Rhapsody on Dumbarton Rock, climbed by Dave MacLeod, featured French 8c/+ climbing with the potential of a 20-metre fall onto a small wire. In August 2008, MacLeod completed a new project close to Tower Ridge on Ben Nevis called 'Echo Wall'. He left the route ungraded, saying only that it was 'harder than Rhapsody'. Many climbers consider such high grades provisional, as the climbs have not yet been achieved on-sight/ground-up.

The grade "XS" (occasionally qualified by Mild [MXS] and Hard [HXS]) is sometimes used for eXtremely Severe rock climbs when a high proportion of the challenge is due to objective dangers, typically loose or crumbling rock, rather than technical difficulty.

Technical grade
The technical grade attempts to assess only the technical climbing difficulty of the hardest move or short sequence of moves on the route, without regard to the danger of the move or the stamina required if there are several such moves in a row. Technical grades are open-ended, starting at 1 and subdivided into "a", "b" and "c", but are rarely used below 3c. The technical grade was originally a bouldering grade introduced from Fontainebleau by French climbers.

Usually the technical grade increases with the adjectival grade, but a hard technical move that is well protected (that is, notionally safe) may not raise the standard of the adjectival grade very much. VS 4c might be a typical grade for a route. VS 4a might indicate very poor protection (easy moves, but no gear) or extremely sustained (every move is 4a and the climbing is steep/strenuous whilst reasonably protected), while VS 5b would usually indicate one crux move of 5b that is the first move or very well protected and the rest of the climb without much difficulty. On multi-pitch routes it is usual to give the overall climb an adjectival grade and each pitch a separate technical grade (such as HS 4b, 4a).

UIAA
The UIAA grading system is mostly used for short rock routes in Germany, Austria, Switzerland, Czech Republic, Slovakia and Hungary. On long routes it is often used in the Alps and Himalaya. Using Roman numerals, it was originally intended to run from I (easiest) to VI (hardest), but as with all other grading systems, improvements to climbing standards have led to the system being open-ended after the grade VII was accepted in 1977. An optional + or − may be used to further differentiate difficulty. As of 2016, the hardest climbs are XII.

Cracow Scale (Kurtyka's Scale)

In the '70s, in Poland, the UIAA scale was in use, when climbing limestone rocks near Cracow, where Polish sport climbing was developed. Grade-I route was considered a walk, while Grade-VI was described as "hardest". As climbing level was growing, the scale seemed more and more inadequate. Famous climber and alpinist Wojciech Kurtyka proposed an extension to the scale. Simpler routes were described as it was before - using Roman numerals. Harder ones - using Arabic numerals after Roman VI. Hence, after traditional VI+ came VI.1, VI.1+, VI.2 and so on. Currently, the hardest route graded in Cracow Scale is Stal Mielec in Mamutowa cave, Jura Krakowsko-Czestochowska, graded as VI.8+.

Scandinavian
In Sweden, Norway, and Finland, they originally used the UIAA scale. But since it was thought that 6+ would be the definition of how hard humans could climb, no climber wanted to put up this grade, leaving the entire scale very sand-bagged compared to the UIAA scale. To show that it is a Scandinavian grade, Arabic numerals are used (e.g. 5, 6, 7), and for UIAA graded climbs in Scandinavia, Roman numerals are used (e.g. V, VI, VII). In some guide books, where many Germans have done the first ascent, the UIAA scale is used for those climbs, and where the first ascent is done by a Scandinavian, the Scandinavian scale is used. The only way to know how the climb is rated is to know whether the first person to ascend was German or Scandinavian. In sport climbing the French scale is pretty common (especially for the hardest grades), or both scales are used in the guide book, with the other scale in parentheses, i.e. 6+ (6b).

Saxon grades
The Saxon grading system is used in the Free State of Saxony in Germany and in a derivative form in some areas in the Czech Republic under the name. It was  developed in the beginning of the 20th century for the formidable Saxon Switzerland climbing region and was gradually adopted within other climbing areas in the region, such as Bohemian Switzerland, Bohemian Paradise, Lusatian Mountains, and the Zittau Mountains.

Due to the climbing particularities of the region and the territorial and political division of Germany in 1945–1990  the system developed independently from other grading systems in Germany. During this time it was also sometimes referred to as the "East German System".

The Saxon grades use Roman numerals to denote the level of difficulty and subdivisions from grade VII onwards with the aid of the letter a, b and c; XIc is currently the highest grade. In addition the system accounts for horizontal jumps with Arabic numerals between 1 and 7.

French numerical grades
The French numerical system (distinct from the adjectival system, described later) rates a climb according to the overall technical  difficulty and strenuousness  of the route. Grades start at 1 (very easy) and the system is open-ended. Each numerical grade can be subdivided by adding a letter (a, b or c). Examples: 2, 4, 4b, 6a, 7c. An optional + may be used to further differentiate difficulty. For example, these routes are sorted by ascending difficulty: 5c+, 6a, 6a+, 6b, 6b+. Although some countries in Europe use a system with similar grades but not necessarily matching difficulties, the French system remains the main system used in the vast majority of European countries and in many international events outside the US.

Brazilian
The Brazilian grade system for sport climbing is similar to the French system, but uses roman numerals with a few adjustments: grades I to II are very easy (II being a very steep, but almost walkable route), III to V are easy (III being the grade most indoor gyms use as a starting point for beginners) and it progresses till the maximum grade of XIII, as of 2020. Grades below VII are subdivided differently depending on the geographical location of the crag:

 Most regions split grades I through VI by adding the suffix "sup" (for example, a IVsup is harder than a IV and easier than a V). This system is used up to VIsup, which until the 1980s was the hardest grade in the country. After VIsup the French subdivisions "a", "b" and "c" are used, but not the "+" extension (for example, VIIa, Xa, XIc). The roman system is often dropped and substituted by cardinal numbers (that is, VIsup becomes 6sup).
 In other regions the French writing system is adopted in full and there are no "sup" suffixes (thus, VIsup is said to be 6c, etc.). Again, no "+" can be added. The mapping from roman numerals to cardinal numbers occurs because, in the regions where this system is adopted, traditional climbing is scarce and most routes are sport routes (see below).

The Brazilian system has a remarkably detailed grading system for traditional climbing, which due to the geology in the country consists mostly of long, bolted/mixed routes instead of pure crack climbing. The basic structure is given in the example below.

 Duration: The time it should take for a team to finish the route. The approach might or might not be included, depending on whether or not one assumes the grading as specified by the CBME (Brazilian Climbing and Mountaineering Confederation). The grades go from D1 (one to two hours) to D7 (several days in a remote environment). Duration is sometimes included after the Danger Component.
 General grade: Written in cardinal numbers and with no subdivisions, this describes the overall difficulty one "feels" when climbing a route. In the example, the 5º means that one feels mostly climbing something around sport grade V (this does not mean there cannot be easier or harder sections, see below).
 Hardest move (aidable?): Represents the difficulty of the hardest section of the route, which might be a single move or a whole pitch. Uses sport climbing grading system. If the section can be avoided by aid climbing, the aid grade and the true crux grade are included in parenthesis. The second hardest move is then appended in front. In the example, one can read "VIsup (A1/VIIIc)" as "the hardest section is VIsup except for an VIIIc section that can be bypassed by aid climbing an A1".
 Hardest aid: Grade of the hardest mandatory aid climbing section (if there is any), using the Yosemite system.
 Danger component: Since most routes are bolted, this item represents the danger one faces due to the mean distance between bolts. This is important because, quite often, it is impossible to protect run-outs due to the absence of cracks. The danger scale goes from E1 to E5, no subdivisions, with E1 being very safe (similar to typical sport routes) and E5 meaning almost certain death (usually includes whole pitches with belay bolts only). E2, for example, represents a route that is said to be "mostly ok", and the climber should feel "sort of safe". The grades are very relative, and since the danger component is measured by "feel" and not in meters, several climbers disagree on what constitutes a safe route. There is also a significant disparity in the E scale depending on the crag: an E3 in a place can often correspond to an E2 somewhere else, where a tradition of dangerous climbing is dominant (e.g. Salinas, in the state of Rio de Janeiro). A significant flaw in this grading system is that an E2 route might be just plain suicidal, but easy enough so that one would never feel as if falling were possible.

It is important to keep in mind that all the items in the grading system are independent. One can then have grades like "D4 4º VIIc A3 E3", or "D1 7º VIIc (A0/VIIIb) E1". The first route takes a whole day to be climbed, mostly on easy terrain, but with some serious aid and a very hard crux (when compared to the general grade) that cannot be bypassed by aiding. The second route, on the other hand, has much harder free climbing than the first one, but is safer, shorter and a crux that can be aid climbed as an A0.

Ewbank
The Ewbank system, used in Australia, New Zealand, and South Africa, was developed in the mid 1960s by John Ewbank. Ewbank also developed an open ended “M” system for aid climbing. The numerical Ewbank system is open-ended, starting from 1, which one can (at least in theory) walk up, to the six climbs located in Australia given the hardest currently confirmed grade of 35. South African and Australian grades differ by 1 or 2 grade points.

The Ewbank system is not intended to simply grade the hardest individual move on a climb though the grading system is often described this way.  Ewbank explained "Grading takes the following into consideration: Technical difficulty, exposure, length, quality of rock, protection and other smaller factors. As these are more or less all related to each other, I have rejected the idea of 3 or 4 grades, i.e. one for exposure, one for technical difficulty, one for protection etc. Instead the climb is given its one general grading, and if any of the other factors is outstanding, this is stated verbally in the short introduction to that climb"

The current practice is to make mention of all factors affecting the climber's experience (exposure, difficulty of setting protection or outright lack of protection) in the description of the climb contained in the guide.

Machine learning

Researchers have demonstrated that the difficulty of climbing routes can be predicted using statistical models and machine learning techniques. A Bradley-Terry model based on historical ascents generated ratings on an interval scale that were correlated with grades from the Ewbank system. A different approach, using a variable-order Markov model with a description of the sequence of climbing moves, was unable to correctly predict difficulty.

Mountaineering
There are several systems in use to grade mountain climbs. Alpine mountaineering routes are usually graded based on all of their different aspects, as they can be very diverse. Thus, a mountain route may be graded 5.6 (rock difficulty), A2 (aid difficulty), WI3 (ice climbing difficulty), M5 * (mixed climbing difficulty), 70 degrees (steepness),  (length), VI (commitment level), and many other factors. See also Summitpost Alpine Grades.

International French adjectival system (IFAS)
In contrast to the French numerical system (described earlier), the French adjectival alpine system evaluates the overall difficulty of a route, taking into consideration the length, difficulty, exposure and commitment-level of the route (i.e., how hard it may be to retreat). The overall grade combines altitude; length and difficulty of approach and descent; number of difficult pitches and how sustained they are; exposure; and quality of rock, snow and ice. These are, in increasing order:
 F: facile (easy). Straightforward, possibly a glacial approach, snow and ice will often be at an easy angle.
 PD: peu difficile (slightly difficult). Routes may be longer at altitude, with snow and ice slopes up to 45 degrees. Glaciers are more complex, scrambling is harder, climbing may require some belaying, descent may involve rappelling. More objective hazards. 
 AD: assez difficile (fairly difficult). Fairly hard, snow and ice at an angle of 45–65 degrees, rock climbing up to UIAA grade III, but not sustained, belayed climbing in addition to a large amount of exposed but easier terrain. Significant objective hazard.
 D: difficile (difficult). Hard, more serious with rock climbing at IV and V, snow and ice slopes at 50–70 degrees. Routes may be long and sustained or harder but shorter. Serious objective hazards.
 TD: très difficile (very difficult). Very hard, routes at this grades are serious undertakings with high level of objective danger. Sustained snow and ice at an angle of 65–80 degrees, rock climbing at grade V and VI with possible aid, very long sections of hard climbing.
 ED1/2/3/4: extrêmement difficile (extremely difficult). Extremely hard, exceptional objective danger, vertical ice slopes and rock climbing up to VI to VIII, with possible aid pitches.
 ABO: Abominablement difficile (abominably difficult) Difficulty and danger at their limit.

Often a + (pronounced Sup for supérieur) or a − (pronounced Inf for inférieur) is placed after the grade to indicate if a particular climb is at the lower or upper end of that grade (e.g., a climb slightly harder than "PD+" might be "AD−").

Romanian
In communist times, alpine climbs were graded in a system adapting Russian grades to local conditions, by leaving out route altitude and approach difficulties (since all Romanian alpine climbs are accessible in a day, and below 2600m).

However, the system has two large problems. The first is the obscure mix of technical difficulty and length/commitment, which leads to highly different routes, even in the same area, having the same grade; for example, in Bicaz, both Creasta Estica a Pietrei Altarului, a beginner-friendly ridge with five out of six pitches of UIAA 4 terrain (assuming the one aid move is taken as such) and one of easy UIAA 6, and Fisura Centrala, a two-pitch UIAA 7 crack climb, are 4As. The second is the integration with the Communist-era competitional system that led to grades varying quite a bit from area to area – a Bicaz 6 will be easier than a Bucegi 6, for example. Because of this, modern documentation also usually contains the UIAA/French free-climbing rating of the crux of the route, as well as the aid-climbing rating (in the original aid-climbing grading system) + the mandatory climbing rating – so, for example, the direct Fisura Albastra is a 8+ (6+ A1).

New Zealand
An alpine grading system adapted from the grades used in the Aoraki/Mt Cook Region is widely used in New Zealand for alpine routes in the North and South islands. Grades currently go from 1–7. The grading system is open ended; harder climbs are possible. Factors which determine grade are (in descending order of contributing weight): technical difficulty, objective danger, length and access.

Standard grading system for alpine routes in normal conditions
 New Zealand Grade 1: Easy scramble. Use of rope generally only for glacier travel.
 New Zealand Grade 2: Steeper trickier sections may need a rope.
 New Zealand Grade 3: Longer steeper sections generally. Use of technical equipment necessary. Ice climbs may require two tools.
 New Zealand Grade 4: Technical climbing. Knowledge of how to place ice and rock gear quickly and efficiently a must. Involves a long day.
 New Zealand Grade 5: Sustained technical climbing. May have vertical sections on ice.
 New Zealand Grade 6: Multiple crux sections. Vertical ice may not have adequate protection. Good mental attitude and solid technique necessary. May require a bivy on route and be a long way from civilization.
 New Zealand Grade 7: Vertical ice/rock which may not have adequate protection. Rock grades in the high 20s (Ewbank). Climb may be in remote area. May require a bivy on route.

Alaskan
In the Alaskan grading system, mountaineering climbs range from grade 1–6, and factor in difficulty, length, and commitment. The hardest, longest routes are Alaskan grade 6. The system was first developed by Boyd N. Everett, Jr. in 1966, and is supposed to be particularly adapted to the special challenges of Alaskan climbing. Here is a summary of Alaska grade descriptors, adapted (and greatly simplified) from Alaska: A Climbing Guide, by Michael Wood and Colby Coombs (The Mountaineers, 2001):
 Alaska Grade 1: Climb requires one day only, no technical (fifth-class) climbing.
 Alaska Grade 2: Either a moderate fifth-class one-day climb, or a straightforward multiday nontechnical climb.
 Alaska Grade 3: Either a serious fifth-class one-day climb, or a multiday climb with some technical elements.
 Alaska Grade 4: Multiday, moderately technical climb.
 Alaska Grade 5: Multiday, highly technical climb.
 Alaska Grade 6: Multiday, extremely technical climb.
A plus (+) may be added to indicate somewhat higher difficulty. For example, the West Buttress Route on Denali is graded 2+ in the above-mentioned guidebook.

Importantly, even an Alaska Grade 1 climb may involve climbing on snow and glaciers in remote locations and cold weather.

Russian (post-USSR countries)
In post USSR countries, there is Russian grading system, it includes range from grade 1A–6B, and factor in difficulty, altitude, length, and commitment like in Alaskan.
 Grade 1A – Any type of ascent which can be regarded as more than simple hiking. No lower limit of ascent in meters and no specified elevation is needed to qualify for this grade.
 Grade 1B – Easy ascent of a peak between 2000–5000 m over rocks, with sections of snow and ice or mixed ground. 
 Grade 2A – Ascent of more than 500 m on a peak between 2000–6000 m or traverses at this height on rocks, snow or ice with rock pitches of up to II, and/or snow and ice sections of up to 100 m of II. 
 Grade 2B – Ascent of a peak between 2000–6000 m or traverses at this height on rock, snow and ice with short sections of grade III rock or ice. Some pitons for belaying. 
 Grade 3A – Ascent of a peak between 2500–6500 m or traverses at this height on rock, snow and ice. Route length up to 600 m with long passages of II on rock and ice. 
 Grade 3B – Ascent (600 m or longer) on a peak between 2500–6500 m or traverses at this height on rock, snow and ice. Difficulties might include rock pitches of 20–30 m or more and snow and ice sections of 200–300 m of difficulty III, or shorter passages of IV. 
 Grade 4A – Ascent (at least 600 m) on a peak between 2500–7000 m or traverses at this height. The route would include 20–50 m rock pitches of IV, or snow and ice sections of 200–300 m or more of IV. The route might take 6–8 hours or more and require pitons belays. Traverses of this grade would combine at least 5 routes of Grade 3B or combinations equivalent to this. 
 Grade 4B – Ascent (at least 600 m) on a peak between 2500–7000 m or traverses at this height with rock sections of 40–80 m of IV, or short passages of V, and snow and ice sections of 300–400 m or more of IV. The route would normally take 8–10 hours or more and require the insertion of 8–10 pitons or more for belaying. Traverses would include at least 2 routes of Grade 4A. 
 Grade 5A – Ascent (at least 600 m) on a peak between 3000–7500 m or traverses at this height. The route would have long rock sections of III–IV with some pitches of V, or snow and ice sections of 300–400 m or more of V. The route could take 10–15 hours or more and would require the insertion of 20–40 pitons or more for belaying. Traverses combine at least two routes of Grade 4B and 1 route of Grade 4A. 
 Grade 5B – Ascent (at least 700 m) on a peak between 3000–7500 m or traverses at this height. The route would have long sections of III–IV with pitches of up to 50 m of V and short sections of VI, or snow and ice sections of 600–800 m or more of V. The route would take 15–20 hours and require the insertion of 30–50 pitons or more for belaying. Traverses combine at least 2 routes of Grade 5A. 
 Grade 6A – Ascent (at least 800 m) on a peak over 3600 m or traverses at this height on rocks or mixed ground. Sustained difficulty with an average grade of IV–V and pitches of 20 m or more of VI. The route would take 40–50 hours and require the insertion of 100–150 pitons or more for belaying. Traverses combine at least 3 routes of Grade 5B. 
 Grade 6B – Ascent of at least 1000 m on a peak over 4500 m or traverses of this height. Sustained difficulty of pitches at or over grade V. The route would take more than 48 hours to complete. Insertion of more than 250 belaying points. Usually this grade is reserved for the highest and most difficult peaks or desperate routes on lower peaks. Extremely hard routes on peaks below 4500 m can sometimes qualify for 6B.

Ice and mixed climbing
Ice climbing and mixed climbing have a number of grading systems.

WI numeric scale
This system measures the difficulty of routes on water ice. The WI scale spans grades from 1 to 7. There also exists a rating scale for Alpine Ice (compacted snow or glacial ice) that has the same rating system as the "WI" system, but is instead denoted by "AI." The primary difference between the two is the density of the ice, Water Ice being much more dense.

WI2 – low-angled (60 degree consistent ice), with good technique can be easily climbed with one ice axe. Grades beyond this generally require the use of two ice tools.

WI3 – generally sustained in the 60–70 degree range with occasional near-vertical steps up to 4 metres (Cascade Waterfall, Banff; This House of Sky, Ghost River)

WI4 – near-vertical steps of up to 10 metres, generally sustained climbing requiring placing protection screws from strenuous stances (Professor's Falls, Banff; Weeping Wall Left, Icefields Parkway, Banff; Silk Tassle, Yoho; Moonlight & Snowline, Kananskis)

WI4+ – highly technical WI4. (Wicked Wanda, Ghost River)

WI5 – near-vertical or vertical steps of up to 20 metres, sustained climbing requiring placing multiple protection screws from strenuous stances with few good rests (Carlsberg Column, Field; The Sorcerer, Ghost River; Bourgeau Left Hand, Banff)

WI5+ – highly technical WI5 (Oh le Tabernac, Icefield Parkway; Hydrophobia, Ghost River; Sacre Bleu, Banff)

WI6 – vertical climbing for the entire pitch (e.g. 30–60 metres) with no rests. Requires excellent technique and/or a high level of fitness (The Terminator, Banff; Nemesis, Kootenay Park; Whiteman Falls, Kananaskis Country; Riptide, Banff)

WI6+ – vertical or overhanging with no rests, and highly technical WI6 (Fosslimonster, Norway; French Maid, Yoho; French Reality, Kootenay Park)

WI7–WI9 – sustained and overhanging with no rests. Rare and widely accepted testpieces. Note that routes (e.g. Sea of Vapours, Banff; Riptide, Icefield Parkway, Banff) have been assigned WI7− to WI7+ but have been subsequently downgraded in later years as they don't meet the strict criteria of difficulty.

Modern ice-climbers have established even more severe grades for waterfall ice climbs that are largely severely overhanging, notable milestones being:

WI10 – Spray On (first W10 climbed by Tim Emmett and Will Gadd in 2010 at Helmcken Falls).

WI11 – Wolverine (first W11 climbed by Tim Emmett and Klemen Premrl in 2011 at Helmcken Falls).

WI12 – Interstellar Spice (first W12 climbed by Tim Emmett and Klemen Premrl in 2016 at Helmcken Falls).

WI13 – Mission to Mars (first W13 climbed Tim Emmett and Klemen Premrl in 2020 at Helmcken Falls).

M numeric scale
This measures the difficulty of mixed climbs combining ice and rock. Mixed climbs have recently been climbed and graded as high as M14.
 M1–3: Easy. Low angle; usually no tools.
 M4: Slabby to vertical with some technical dry tooling.
 M5: Some sustained vertical dry tooling.
 M6: Vertical to overhanging with difficult dry tooling.
 M7: Overhanging; powerful and technical dry tooling; less than 10 m of hard climbing.
 M8: Some nearly horizontal overhangs requiring very powerful and technical dry tooling; bouldery or longer cruxes than M7.
 M9: Either continuously vertical or slightly overhanging with marginal or technical holds, or a juggy roof of 2 to 3 body lengths.
 M10: At least 10 meters of horizontal rock or 30 meters of overhanging dry tooling with powerful moves and no rests.
 M11: A ropelength of overhanging gymnastic climbing, or up to 15 meters of roof.
 M12–M14: With bouldery, dynamic moves and tenuous technical holds.

Scottish winter system

In the British Isles, the Scottish winter grading system is used for both ice and mixed climbs. Originally the system had just an overall grade given in Roman numerals running up to VI, but this has been refined and extended. Routes are given two grades, essentially equivalent to the adjectival and technical grades used in British traditional climbing. Overall difficulty is signified by a Roman numeral, and the technical difficulty of the hardest move or section of the climb is graded with an Arabic numeral. For routes of grade I – III, the technical grade is usually omitted unless it is 4 or greater. As with other grading systems, advances in climbing have led to the acceptance of an open-ended grading system (the new grades previously finished at IX, 9), and climbs have now been graded up to XII, 12.

I – Simple snow slopes or gullies; ridges in good conditions. May have small ice step or cornice.
II – Snow gullies with short pitches. Ice tools may be needed. Exposed ridges with rocky sections.
III – Gullies including long or difficult pitches. Mixed ice and rock. Equivalent to "Very Difficult" in summer. (Equivalent to French adjectival D or D+).
IV – Major gullies with several difficult pitches. Difficult buttresses and steep icefalls. Vertical or near-vertical ice. (Equivalent to French adjectival TD- to TD+).
V – Major gullies with continuous and steeper sections. Vertical ice and long runouts required. Very difficult buttresses with technical exposed parts or long, exposed and serious runouts. (Equivalent to French adjectival TD+ to ED-).
VI – Very steep, technical climbs. Generally mixed ice and rock. Vertical or overhanging pitches and/or poor protection. (Equivalent to French adjectival ED to ED+).
VII – Routes of many pitches with long sections of vertical or thin ice, or mixed routes with much highly technical climbing.
VIII – IX: Hardest routes in Scotland.

Bouldering

There are many grading systems used specifically for bouldering problems, including:
 The Fontainebleau grading system, which is the most widely used grading system in Europe. The grades in this system appear similar to those used in France for free climbing (French numerical system), but have different meaning. For instance, an 8a free-climbing route is significantly easier than an 8A boulder problem. Typically, uppercase letters are used in this system (e.g. 8A), while lowercase letters are preferred in the French numerical system (e.g. 8a).
 The Hueco scale, or "V" scale, created by John Sherman, which is the most widely used system in North America.  Although open-ended, the "V" system currently covers a range from V0 to V17.
 The Dankyu system which resembles that of martial arts (see Dan and Kyu), widely used in Japan. Like in martial arts, 1-Kyu is the hardest Kyu grade. Dan starts from where Kyu ends, 1-Dan being the next grade higher than 1-Kyu. Dan gets harder as the number ascends, and is open-ended on the harder side. The hardest routes are currently graded at 6-Dan.
 The UK technical grades (see UK grading system above), open-ended, but currently covering 4 through 7b, used in the United Kingdom for traditional climbs and formerly used to rate boulder problems as well.
 The "B" system, created by John Gill in the 1950s, was used mainly in North America and included only three grades: B1, B2, and B3. B3 was the hardest, indicating routes that had only been completed once.

Aid climbing

Aid climbs are graded A0 to A5 depending on the reliability of the gear placements and the consequences of a fall. New routes climbed today are often given a “New Wave” grade using the original symbols but with new definitions. Depending on the area in question, the letter “A” may mean that the use of pitons (or other gear that requires the use of a hammer) is needed to ascend the route. The letter “C” explicitly indicates that the route can be climbed clean (clean climbing) without the use of a hammer.

Original grading system
 A0: A free climb with an occasional aid move that does not require specialized aid gear ("aiders" or "etriers"). Pulling on gear during a free ascent is often referred to as A0.
 A1: Requires specialized gear but all placements are solid and easy.
 A2: Good placements, but sometimes tricky.
 A3: Many difficult aid moves. Some of the placements might only hold body-weight, but the risk is still low.
 A4: Many body-weight placements in a row. The risk is increasing.
 A5: Enough body-weight placements in a row that a fall might result in a fall of at least 20 meters.

Clean scale
The 'C' scale adopts "New Wave" definitions. Clean aiding is aid climbing without the use of bolting gear, pitons or other gear that scars the rock or becomes fixed after the ascent. Most difficult aid climbs still require pitons or other techniques using a hammer, and are thus rated on the "New Wave" 'A' scale past a certain point.
 C0: Bolt ladder, requires no placement of traditional gear. May indicate a pendulum or tension traverse on a free climb.
 C1: Easy aid and easy placements. Typically nuts, cams and hexes.
 C2: Moderate aid. Solid gear, but difficult to place. May require cam or sky hooks.
 C2+: Up to 10m fall potential but with little risk of injury.
 C3/A3: Hard aid. Many tenuous body-weight only placements in a row. Fall potential up to 15–20 m.
 C3+/A3+: Same as C3/A3, but with longer, more dangerous fall potential.
 C4/A4: Serious aid. Continuously tenuous gear placements in a row with up to 30 m ledge fall potential. RURP placements may be encountered, or may have moderate sections of hooking.
 C4+/A4+: Severe aid. Longer fall potential, with high ledge fall potential. Each pitch can take many hours to lead. Thin nailing is to be expected, or may have long sections of hooking.
 C5/A5: Extreme aid. Nothing on the pitch will hold a fall. A fall may result in the death of the leader or even the whole team.

Note: C5 is a theoretical and controversial grade. Many argue that a pitch is not C5 until a climber or team has died as a direct result of gear failure. However, there are several pitches that currently hold a C5/A5 rating, as none of the gear placed is rated to hold a dynamic fall.

Comparison tables

Free climbing
The following chart compares some of the free climbing grading systems in use around the world.
As mentioned above, grading is a subjective task and no two grading systems have an exact one-to-one correspondence. Therefore, there is not a perfect agreement in the literature about grading system comparisons or conversion rules.

The British Adj grades (E) do not grade only the hardness of the climb but the overall feel of the route, i.e., how hard gear is to place, how good is the gear, how high up is the first piece of gear, the possibility and severity of a ground fall, and how dangerous the climb is. All these factors are regarded when giving it the grade.

Russian grade system can be compared in the following way:

Bouldering
The following grades are used for rating boulder problems throughout the world. Although fundamental differences in climbing style make direct comparison between bouldering and route climbing difficult, the colors in the above and below tables correspond to roughly equivalent sets of grades.

See also

 Degree of difficulty
 Grades in bouldering

References

Climbing